Terrimesophilobacter mesophilus is a Gram-positive, aerobic, mesophilic and motile bacterium from the genus of Terrimesophilobacter which has been isolated from soil from a field from Bigeum Island in Korea.

References

Microbacteriaceae
Bacteria described in 2008
Monotypic bacteria genera